Otasco (Oklahoma Tire and Supply Company) was a retail chain specializing in auto parts and appliances based in Tulsa, Oklahoma.

It was first established in 1918 by three Jewish Lithuanian immigrant brothers, Sam (1898–1939), Maurice (1891–1970), and Herman (1889–1971) Sanditen, who opened the first Otasco store in Okmulgee. The company moved its headquarters to Tulsa in 1925. The company based its business on offering its products on credit.

In 1960, the McCrory Corporation bought the company, while retaining the Sanditen brothers.  In 1968, the chain had 455 units in 12 states. In 1984, the firm's employees bought the company from McCrory, creating one of the largest employee-owned companies in America.  In 1988, the retail chain filed for Chapter 11 bankruptcy which resulted in the closing of 170 stores across 11 states and the loss of 1,600 jobs.

According to a source, franchisees were given a 99-year license to use the Otasco name after the chain went out of business.  As of 2014, two Otasco stores remain in operation in Oklahoma, in Beaver and in Marlow.  Borger, Texas still had a store operating under the Otasco name in 2012. Many, Louisiana has a locally-owned Otasco Associate store still in business as of 2014.

References

Defunct discount stores of the United States
History of Tulsa, Oklahoma